Michinori Yamashita (born 1953 in Japan) is a professor (Japanese mathematician) at the Rissho University. He studied at the Sophia University under Yukiyoshi Kawada and Kiichi Morita.

External links
Home page at Rissho Univ.

20th-century Japanese mathematicians
21st-century Japanese mathematicians
Number theorists
Living people
1953 births
Date of birth missing (living people)
Academic staff of Rissho University
Sophia University alumni